George Khoury may refer to:

George Khouri
 George Khouri (footballer) (born 1962), footballer from Syria

George Khoury
 George Khoury (actor), actor in films such as Looking for Danger (1957)
 George Khoury (author) (born 1971), writer and journalist in the field of comic books
 George Khoury (bishop) (born 1970), Greek bishop
 George Khoury (molecular biologist) (1943–1987), National Cancer Institute researcher
 George Khoury (murder victim) (1983–2004), a murdered Israeli Arab Christian
 George Khoury (record producer) (1909–1998), record producer

See also
 George Khoury Association of Baseball Leagues
Khouri / Khoury